This is an alphabetical list of villages in Bagalkot district, Karnataka, India.

A 

 Achanur
 Adagal
 Adihal
 Adihudi
 Agasarakoppa
 Aiahole
 Aihole
 Akkimaradi
 Alagur
 Alur
 Amalazari
 Amarawati
 Aminagad
 Anadinni
 Anawal
 Andamuranal
 Ankalagi
 Arakeri
 Asangi

B 

 Badagandi
 Baragi
 Basavanagar
 Belagali
 Belura
 Bennur
 Bevinamatti-S.Haveli
 Bevoor
 Bhairamatti
 Bidari
 Bilkerur

C-G 

 Chimmad
 Cholachagudda
 Dammooru
 Dhannur
 Dhavaleshwar
 Fakirbhudihal
 Galagali
 Girisagar
 Gonal
 Gothe
 Gudura

H-J 

 Haldur
 Halingali
 Hebballi
 Hipparagi
 Hirepadasalgi
 Hosakoti
 Hullikere
 Hunnur
 Jagadal
 Jaliberi
 Jalihal
 Jalihala
 Jeeragal

K 

 Kaladgi
 Kamatagi
 Kandgal
 Karadi
 Kataraki
 Kendura
 Killa Hosakoti
 Kishori
 Kittali
 Kulageri
 Kulhalli
 Kundargi

L-R 

 Lakhamapura
 Lokapur
 Mantur
 Mirji
 Mugalkhod
 Muttalageri
 Nagaral
 Navalgi
 Nilagunda
 Old Channal
 Rugi

S-Z 

 Sasalatti
 Savalagi
 Shri Parvatesh
 Sirur
 Sulibhavi
 Tappasakatti
 Teggi
 Todalbagi
 Tungal
 Uttur
 Vajjaramatti
 Yadahalli

Bagalkot district